The vast majority of North American railroads are standard gauge. Exceptions include some streetcar, subway and rapid transit systems, mining and tunneling operations, and some narrow-gauge lines particularly in the west, e.g. the isolated White Pass and Yukon Route system, and the former Newfoundland Railway.

As well as the usual reasons for having one gauge i.e. being able to operate through trains without transfer arrangements, the North American continent-wide system of freight car interchange with rolling stock having the same standard gauge, couplings, and air brakes meant that individual companies could minimise their rolling stock requirements by borrowing from other companies. Peak demand periods varied over the continent, with seasonal requirements e.g. for grain shipments occurring at different times in different areas so that freight cars could be redistributed to cover peaks as required.

Barbados 

Bermuda 
The Bermuda Railway was standard gauge common carrier that operated from 1931 to 1948.

Canada 

After a Royal Commission, in 1851 the broad gauge, called the Provincial gauge, was adopted by the Province of Canada government as the standard gauge. However, in the 1870s, most Canadian railroads  (apart from some narrow-gauge lines) were changed to standard gauge to facilitate interchange with U.S. railroads. The last broad-gauge line closed in 1911.

Guatemala 
The  railroad system of Guatemala no longer operates, see Rail transport in Guatemala.

Mexico 
Mexico currently uses standard gauge. See Rail transport in Mexico

Panama
The Panama Railroad was originally  as in much of the Southern United States.  This gauge was converted to  when the line was rebuilt in 2000. Nowadays only the ship handling trains along the Panama Canal, called mules, still have the 150 cm / 5 ft track.

United States

In 1886, the southern railroads agreed to coordinate changing gauge on all their tracks. After considerable debate and planning, most of the southern rail network was converted from  gauge to  gauge, then the standard of the Pennsylvania Railroad, over two days beginning on May 31, 1886. The new gauge was close enough that standard gauge equipment could run on it without problem. By June 1886, all major railroads in North America were using approximately the same gauge. The final conversion to true standard gauge took place gradually as track was maintained. Now, the only broad-gauge rail systems in the United States are isolated rapid transit, light rail, and streetcar systems as well as some heritage railways and hill railways.

See also

 Narrow-gauge rail transport
 Narrow-gauge railways in Canada
 Narrow-gauge railroads in the United States
 Rail gauge in Europe
 Rail gauge in South America
 Rail gauge in Australia

References

External links
The Ohio Broad Gauge and other fables (article)

Rail transportation in North America